, also known as  for short, and with English subtitle Familia Myth, is a Japanese light novel series written by Fujino Ōmori and illustrated by Suzuhito Yasuda. SB Creative has published eighteen volumes since January 2013 under their GA Bunko imprint.

It has received two manga adaptations as well as an anime television series adaptation produced by J.C.Staff, which aired from April to June 2015. An OVA was released on December 7, 2016. A second anime season and an original anime film adaptation were both announced in February 2018. The film, titled Is It Wrong to Try to Pick Up Girls in a Dungeon?: Arrow of the Orion premiered on February 15, 2019.  The second season aired from July to September 2019. A third anime season and an OVA episode were both announced on September 27, 2019. The third season was slated to air in July 2020, but was delayed due to the COVID-19 pandemic.  The third season aired from October to December 2020. A fourth season aired from July 2022 to March 2023.

Additionally, a spin-off light novel series titled Is It Wrong to Try to Pick Up Girls in a Dungeon? On the Side: Sword Oratoria began in January 2014, and another spin-off light novel series titled Is It Wrong to Try to Pick Up Girls in a Dungeon?: Familia Chronicle (illustrated by Nilitsu) began in March 2017. Both spinoffs have also received manga adaptations, and an anime television adaptation of Sword Oratoria aired from April to June 2017.

Synopsis

Setting 
The story takes place in the fictional city of Orario. The city is home to a number of gods who, seeking excitement, chose to limit their divine powers in order to experience the hardships of those who reside on the mortal world. These shards are used to craft magic items and other treasures; however, they can also be exchanged directly for the world's currency. In a fashion typical of role playing games, the power of an adventurer is quantified by their level and a number of ability scores. By defeating more powerful monsters, an adventurer is able to increase their own level and ability scores, as well as unlock special powers known as skills.

Plot 
The story follows the adventures of Bell Cranel, a 14-year-old rookie adventurer and sole member of the Hestia Familia. He looks up to Ais Wallenstein, a famous and powerful swordswoman of the Loki Familia, and vows to become as strong as her following a chance encounter where she saves his life from a powerful monster. While Ais is the object of Bell's romantic affection, several other girls, deities and mortals alike, have similar feelings for him; most notably, Hestia herself.

Media

Light novels 

Fujino Ōmori wrote the story under the title Familia Myth as his entry for the 4th GA Bunko Award, where he won the Great Prize and received an offer for publication. The first light novel volume was published on January 15, 2013, by SB Creative under their GA Bunko imprint. As of January 24, 2023, eighteen volumes have been published. The series has estimated sales of over 9 million copies as of January 2018. Yen Press has licensed the series in North America and released the first volume under the Yen On imprint in December 2014. The light novel ranked at No. 4 in 2014 in Takarajimasha's annual light novel guide book Kono Light Novel ga Sugoi!.

Manga 

The series has been adapted into three manga series. The one based on the novels is illustrated by Kunieda and started serialization in Square Enix's seinen manga magazine Young Gangan from August 2, 2013. It has been collected in ten tankōbon volumes. Yen Press announced at their New York Comic Con 2014 panel the rights to publish the manga in North America.

The Episode Ryu manga series is a special story focused on character Ryu Lion from the main series.

A four-panel manga series titled  by Masaya Takamura began serialization in Square Enix's online manga magazine Gangan Online from August 14, 2014.

Anime 

An anime television series adaptation by J.C.Staff began airing the broadcast night of April 3, 2015. The opening theme is "Hey World" by Yuka Iguchi, and the ending theme is "Right Light Rise" by Kanon Wakeshima. Crunchyroll had previously streamed the series internationally outside Asia. Sentai Filmworks has licensed the anime for digital and home video release in North America with an English dub released in March 2017. In Southeast Asia, the anime is licensed by Muse Communication and airs on Aniplus Asia. An original video animation was released on December 7, 2016.

A second season of the anime and an original film adaptation titled  were announced on February 18, 2018, during the GA Bunko 2018 Happyō Stage at Wonder Festival. The film was directed by Katsushi Sakurabi, written by Fujino Ōmori, with animation by J.C.Staff and music by Keiji Inai. The film was released on February 15, 2019, in Japan. The second season aired from July 13 to September 28, 2019.  Hideki Tachibana replaced Yoshiki Yamakawa as the director of the second season. The rest of the cast and staff reprised their roles. The opening theme for the second season is "HELLO to DREAM" by Iguchi, and the ending theme is "Sayakana Shukusai" by Sora tob sakana. HIDIVE streamed a Dubcast for the second season.

A third season of the anime series and an OVA episode were both announced on September 27, 2019. The second OVA episode was released on January 29, 2020. The third season was originally scheduled to start broadcasting in July 2020, but the anime production committee delayed the broadcast to "October or later" due to the effects of COVID-19. On July 4, 2020, it was announced that the third season was rescheduled to broadcast in October 2020. The third season aired from October 3 to December 19, 2020, and ran for 12 episodes. The opening theme for the third season is "Over and Over" by Iguchi, and the ending theme is "Evergreen" by sajou no hana. On December 18, 2020, a third OVA episode was announced, which was released on April 28, 2021.

A fourth season of the anime series was announced at GA FES 2021 on January 31, 2021. The main staff from previous seasons are reprising their roles. Fujino Ōmori, the original author, will supervise the scripts alongside Hideki Shirane. The fourth season premiered on July 23, 2022 and ended on October 1, 2022 running for 11 episodes. The first opening theme for the fourth season is "Tentō" by sajou no hana, and the first ending theme is "Guide" by Saori Hayami. It continued on January 7, 2023 and ended on March 18, 2023 with another 11 episodes, adding a total of 22 episodes. The second opening theme is "Shikō" by Saori Hayami, and the second ending theme is "Kirikizu" by sajou no hana. aired from October 3 to December 19,

After the acquisition of Crunchyroll by Sony Pictures Television, the parent company of Funimation in 2021, Is It Wrong to Try to Pick Up Girls in a Dungeon?, among several Sentai titles, was dropped from the Crunchyroll streaming service on March 31, 2022.

Video games 
5pb. announced that they are developing a "dungeon action RPG" based on the light novels titled Is It Wrong to Try to Pick Up Girls in a Dungeon?: Infinite Combate or DanMachi: Infinite Combate, released on PlayStation 4, PlayStation Vita, Nintendo Switch, and Microsoft Windows on November 28, 2019. The PlayStation 4, Nintendo Switch and PC versions was released in North America for August 11, 2020, and Europe for August 7, 2020.

Is It Wrong to Try to Pick Up Girls in a Dungeon?: Memoria Freese or DanMachi: Memoria Freese is a role-playing mobile game for the iOS and Android platforms, released in Japan on June 19, 2017, North America on March 30, 2018 and Europe in 2019. The game sold over 3million copies in its first month, and has about 35million registered users and more than 1million subscribers as of March 2018. The game's earnings are 40% higher in the United States than in Japan. Yoshitsugu Matsuoka, the voice actor of Bell Cranell, was recognized as the Guinness World Record holder for "the largest number of lines performed by a single voice actor in a mobile game" with this game in June 2019. While the game contains many noncanon stories, it has also seen debuts of several major stories written by the Fujino Ōmori himself, such as prequel stories Argonaut and Astrea Record, which have been credited with expanding the series mythology and world-building.

An action role-playing mobile game titled Is It Wrong to Try to Pick Up Girls in a Dungeon? Battle Chronicle was announced in December 2022. It will be released in Q2 2023.

An untitled mobile game developed by Neowiz and 
Gree Entertainment was announced on March 2023.

Spinoff

, or Sword Oratoria for short, is a Japanese light novel side story series, written by Fujino Ōmori and illustrated by Kiyotaka Haimura (based on the designs by Suzuhito Yasuda). The story focuses on the character Ais Wallenstein from the parent Is It Wrong to Try to Pick Up Girls in a Dungeon? series. It has been adapted into a manga series and an anime television series.

See also
 Reborn as a Vending Machine, I Now Wander the Dungeon, the manga adaptation of which is also illustrated by Kunieda

Notes

References

External links 

  
 Anime official website 
 

2013 Japanese novels
2015 anime television series debuts
2019 anime television series debuts
2020 anime television series debuts
2022 anime television series debuts
Anime and manga based on light novels
Book series introduced in 2013
GA Bunko
Gangan Comics manga
Gangan Online manga
J.C.Staff
Japanese webcomics
Light novels
Mass media franchises
Muse Communication
Seinen manga
Sentai Filmworks
Square Enix franchises
Tokyo MX original programming
Webcomics in print
Yen Press titles
Yonkoma